Tapio Junno (12 January 1940, Piippola – 25 December 2006) was a Finnish sculptor. He received the Pro Finlandia medal for his work in 1989.

One central element of Tapio Junno's sculpture is a bronze male, often dazzled by a piercing ray of light. The figures express the alternating feelings of human existence, such as pain and joy, light and shadow.

References

External links
Finland's Visual artists' internet registry

1940 births
2006 deaths
People from Siikalatva
20th-century Finnish sculptors